Kitaibelia is a genus of flowering plants belonging to the family Malvaceae.

Its native range is Western Balkan Peninsula, Southern Turkey to Syria.

Species:

Kitaibelia balansae 
Kitaibelia vitifolia

References

Malveae
Malvaceae genera